Sedlice may refer to places:

Czech Republic
Sedlice, Pelhřimov District, a municipality and village in the Vysočina Region
Sedlice, Příbram District, a municipality and village in the Central Bohemian Region
Sedlice (Strakonice District), a town in the South Bohemian Region

Slovakia
Sedlice, Prešov District, a municipality and village in the Prešov Region